Andre Elton Hardy (born November 28, 1961) is a former American football running back who played in the National Football League (NFL). He played for the Philadelphia Eagles in 1984, the Seattle Seahawks in 1985, and the San Francisco 49ers in 1987. He was drafted by the Eagles in the fifth round of the 1984 NFL Draft. He played college football at Weber State and St. Mary's.

College career
Hardy played college football at St. Mary's and Weber State.

Professional career

Philadelphia Eagles
Hardy was selected by the Philadelphia Eagles in the fifth round (116th overall) of the 1984 NFL Draft. He played in six games for the Eagles during the 1984 season. He had 14 rushes for 41 yards and two receptions for 22 yards. He was released on September 4, 1985, after the Eagles acquired Earnest Jackson from the San Diego Chargers.

First stint with Seahawks
On October 9, 1985, Hardy was signed by the Seattle Seahawks. He was released on November 6 after playing in three games for the Seahawks.

San Francisco 49ers
Hardy signed with the San Francisco 49ers in 1987.

Second stint with Seahawks
Hardy was traded by the 49ers to the Seattle Seahawks in exchange for future draft picks on October 7, 1987. He was re-signed on May 12, 1988. He was released on August 23, 1988.

Personal life
Hardy's son Andre Hardy Jr. signed as an undrafted free agent tight end with the Oakland Raiders attempting to play football after playing college basketball.

References

1961 births
Living people
Players of American football from San Diego
American football fullbacks
Weber State Wildcats football players
Philadelphia Eagles players
Seattle Seahawks players
San Francisco 49ers players
National Football League replacement players